John Emerson "Johne" Binkley (born February 4, 1953, in Fairbanks, Alaska) is a riverboat pilot, businessman and Republican politician from the U.S. state of Alaska.  Binkley served for one term apiece in the Alaska House of Representatives and the Alaska Senate during the mid and late 1980s, but is perhaps better known for his candidacy for governor of Alaska in the 2006 primary election.  In that election, he finished far behind Sarah Palin (who would go on to win the governorship), but also far ahead of one-term incumbent governor Frank Murkowski, by then deeply unpopular amongst Alaskans.

In 2017, the Anchorage Daily News was acquired by Binkley Co., a group run by John's son, Ryan Binkley.

Binkley was elected chair of the non-partisan Alaska Redistricting Board in 2020, following his appointment to the five-member board by Senate President Cathy Giessel.

Biography 
John Emerson Binkley was born on February 4, 1953, in Fairbanks, Alaska, the youngest of three sons and third of four children born to Mary (née Hall) and Charles Madison Binkley, Jr., better known as Jim Binkley.  A graduate of Lathrop High School, Binkley attended Western Michigan University before returning to Bethel, Alaska to start a river freight business. In 1982, Binkley was elected to the Bethel City Council, where he served for four years. He sold the business and, in 1991, was named Chairman and Chief Executive Officer of Riverboat Discovery, a successful tour company. From 1993, he additionally served as president of the El Dorado Gold Mine, a tourist attraction.

In 1985, Binkley was elected to district 25 of the Alaska Legislature, where he served on the finance and fisheries committees. In 1986, he was elected to the Alaska State Senate, district M, where he served until 1990. During that time, he was named to several committee posts, including the Senate Finance Committee (1986–1990); Conference Committee on Budget (1988–1990); Committee on Military & Veterans Affairs (1986–1990); Sub-Committee on Commerce (1986–1990); and the Special Senate Committee on High Seas Salmon Interception. In Alaska, legislators are considered part-time, and many do not typically cease outside employment.

In 2005, Binkley received an associate degree in airframe and powerplant maintenance technology from the University of Alaska Fairbanks.

In 2005, Binkley left both his executive posts to prepare for a run for governor. He placed second in the Republican primary, with 30% of the vote, behind Sarah Palin.

Binkley was chosen to be one of three electors in the Electoral College on Alaska's behalf in the 2020 Presidential Election. He was chosen by the Republican Party, whose presidential candidate was incumbent President Donald Trump. Trump won Alaska.

He is married to Judy Gray Binkley, and they have four children. Binkley is a licensed boat captain and pilot, and enjoys and coaches hockey.

Electoral history

References

External links
 2006 Alaska Gubernatorial Campaign Web site
 Johne Binkley at 100 Years of Alaska's Legislature
 "Alaska businessman John Binkley launches group to defend Dunleavy in recall" from KTOO
 Our Campaigns – John Binkley (AK) profile

|-

1953 births
Alaska city council members
Republican Party Alaska state senators
Businesspeople from Fairbanks, Alaska
Lathrop High School (Alaska) alumni
Living people
Republican Party members of the Alaska House of Representatives
People from Bethel, Alaska
Politicians from Fairbanks, Alaska
University of Alaska Fairbanks alumni
Western Michigan University alumni
2020 United States presidential electors
Candidates in the 2006 United States elections